Brian Bohannon (born February 20, 1971) is an American college football coach. He is the head football coach at Kennesaw State University in Kennesaw, Georgia, a position he has held since the inception of the program in 2013. The Kennesaw State Owls began play in 2015.

Career
On March 24, 2013, Bohannon was introduced as the first head coach of the Owls football team that started play as a member of the Big South Conference in the 2015 season.  Prior to his time at Kennesaw State, Bohannon served as an assistant coach under Paul Johnson at Georgia Southern, Navy and Georgia Tech.

Head coaching record

References

External links
 Kennesaw State profile

1971 births
Living people
American football wide receivers
Gardner–Webb Runnin' Bulldogs football coaches
Georgia Bulldogs football players
Georgia Southern Eagles football coaches
Georgia Tech Yellow Jackets football coaches
Kennesaw State Owls football coaches
Navy Midshipmen football coaches
West Georgia Wolves football coaches
People from Griffin, Georgia